Palais Nikaïa is an indoor concert hall and multi-purpose facility located in Nice, France. It opened on 4 April 2001, and is located five minutes' drive from Côte d'Azur International Airport.

On its own, Palais Nikaïa has seats for between 1,500 and 6,250 persons depending upon configuration, with an upwards maximum of 9,000 capacity including those standing.  However, in a unique arrangement, it is located next to the outdoor Stade Charles-Ehrmann, with sliding glass doors to operate between them, and the two in combination can be used to host very large concerts with up to 50,000 or more in attendance.

Depeche Mode performed at the concert hall on May 4, 2013, during their Delta Machine Tour, in front of a sold-out crowd of 9,904 people.

In addition to concerts, Palais Nikaïa can host variety shows, sporting events, conventions.

References

External links
Official site

Concert halls in France
Music venues in France
Buildings and structures in Nice
Tourist attractions in Nice